Rodrigo Andrés Battaglia (born 12 July 1991) is an Argentine professional footballer who plays as a midfielder for Spanish club Mallorca.

Club career
Battaglia was born in Argentina and is of Italian descent. He spent time in the youth divisions of Vélez Sársfield and Almagro before joining Huracán. He made his professional debut aged 19 in a 3–0 away defeat to Racing Club in the Primera División on 3 October 2010. His first goal for the club came on 26 March 2011 in a 2–0 win against Gimnasia y Esgrima de La Plata.

In January 2014, Battaglia joined S.C. Braga in Portugal, playing 26 games for the club with loan spells in the middle at fellow Primeira Liga sides Moreirense and Chaves, and at his homeland club Rosario Central.

On 15 May 2018, Battaglia and several of his teammates, including coaches, were injured following an attack by around 50 supporters of Sporting at the club's training ground after the team finished third in the league and missed out on the UEFA Champions League qualification. Despite the attack, he and the rest of the team agreed to play in the Portuguese Cup final scheduled for the following weekend, which they lost to C.D. Aves.

On 27 August 2020, he went to Deportivo Alavés on loan.

On 12 August 2021, Battaglia joined Mallorca on a season-long loan. On 29 July 2022, he joined Mallorca permanently, signing a two-year deal.

International career
Battaglia played nine games for the Argentina U-20 team in the 2011 South American Youth Championship held in January and February 2011 in Peru. The team finished third in this tournament, qualifying for the 2011 FIFA U-20 World Cup held in July and August 2011 in Colombia. Battaglia appeared in four out of five tournament matches, before the team was eliminated in the quarter-final by Portugal.

In May 2018 he was named in Argentina's preliminary 35 man squad for the 2018 World Cup in Russia. However, he was not included the final 23 man squad selected by coach Jorge Sampaoli.

On 11 September 2018, Battaglia made his debut in the senior team in a 0-0 draw friendly match against the Colombia national football team.

Career statistics

Club

Honours
Sporting CP
 Taça da Liga: 2017–18, 2018–19

Notes

References

External links
Profile at the RCD Mallorca website

1991 births
Living people
People from Morón Partido
Argentine footballers
Argentina international footballers
Argentina under-20 international footballers
Association football midfielders
Club Atlético Huracán footballers
Racing Club de Avellaneda footballers
S.C. Braga players
S.C. Braga B players
Moreirense F.C. players
Rosario Central footballers
G.D. Chaves players
Sporting CP footballers
Deportivo Alavés players
RCD Mallorca players
Argentine Primera División players
Primera Nacional players
Primeira Liga players
La Liga players
Argentine expatriate footballers
Argentine expatriate sportspeople in Portugal
Expatriate footballers in Portugal
Argentine expatriate sportspeople in Spain
Expatriate footballers in Spain
Argentine people of Italian descent
Sportspeople from Buenos Aires Province